Scott Ellis (born April 19, 1957) is an American stage director, actor, and television director.

Biography
Ellis graduated from Goodman School of Drama at the Art Institute of Chicago (now at DePaul University) in Chicago.  He also graduated from James W. Robinson Secondary School, Fairfax, VA, in 1975. He studied acting at HB Studio in New York City. Ellis has a twin brother named Mark Ellis, who is the Executive Director of the International Bar Association.

Before he became a director, Ellis was a successful stage actor; he performed on Broadway in the original casts of the 1980 original musical Musical Chairs and The Rink with Liza Minnelli and Chita Rivera.

He has directed numerous Off-Broadway and Broadway productions, as well as the New York City Opera Company revivals at the New York State Theater: A Little Night Music (1990) and 110 in the Shade (1992).

Ellis has been the Associate Artistic Director for the Roundabout Theatre since 1998.

He has been nominated for the Tony Award as Best Director nine times: the revival of She Loves Me (1994), Steel Pier (1997), the revival of 1776 (1998), Twelve Angry Men (2005), Curtains (2007), the revival of The Mystery of Edwin Drood (2013), the revival of You Can't Take It with You (2015), another revival of She Loves Me (2016), and Tootsie (2019). He received the 1991 Drama Desk Award, Outstanding Director of a Musical, for And The World Goes Round. He won the Olivier Award as Best Director, Musical, for She Loves Me.

He was the executive producer for the television drama Weeds on Showtime, and has directed television episodes of Modern Family, Nurse Jackie, The Good Wife, Hung, 30 Rock, Desperate Housewives, The Closer and Frasier. He received an Emmy Award nomination in 2007 for directing the episode "The Break Up" of the comedy series 30 Rock.

In 2010, Playbill announced that Ellis was expected to direct upcoming musical adaptations of the 1930s films The Blue Angel and Little Miss Marker. Both would have books by David Thompson.

Work

Stage

Musical Chairs (1980) (as an actor)
The Rink (1984) (as an actor)
Billy Bishop Goes to War (1987) (as an actor, Whole Theatre Co.)
And the World Goes 'Round (1991)
She Loves Me (1993)
A Month in the Country (1995) starring Helen Mirren
Steel Pier (1997)
1776 (1997)
Present Laughter (1998)
The Rainmaker (1999)
The Man Who Had All the Luck (2002)
The Boys from Syracuse (2002)
Twelve Angry Men (2004)
The Little Dog Laughed (2006)
Curtains (2007)
Gruesome Playground Injuries (2011)
Harvey (2012)
The Mystery of Edwin Drood (2012)
You Can't Take It with You (2014)
The Elephant Man (2014) starring Bradley Cooper
On the Twentieth Century (2015)
She Loves Me (2016)
Kiss Me, Kate (2019)
Tootsie (2019)
Take Me Out (2022)

Television

Frasier (2000–04)
Hope & Faith (2005–06)
Out of Practice (2005)
Stacked (2005)
30 Rock (2006)
Desperate Housewives (2008)
Weeds (2008–11)
Hung (2009)
The Good Wife episode "Home" (2009)
Nurse Jackie (2009)
Running Wilde (2010)
Modern Family (2010–11)
Mad Love (2011)
2 Broke Girls (2011–13)
Guys with Kids (2012)
The New Normal (2012–13)
The Michael J. Fox Show (2013–14)
Dads episode: "Comic Book Issues" (2013)
Us & Them episode: "Upstairs & Downstairs" (2014)
Mixology episode: "Dominic & Stacey" (2014)
Undateable (2014)
One Big Happy episode: "Pilot" (2015)
Dr. Ken (2015–16)
Superior Donuts (2017)
The Marvelous Mrs. Maisel (2017–18)
A Christmas Story Live! (2017)
Divorce (2018)
Fam (2019)
Carol's Second Act (2019–20)
All Rise episode: "What The Bailiff Saw" (2020)
Tommy episode: "Cause of Death" (2020)

References

"PLAYBILL.COM'S BRIEF ENCOUNTER with Scott Ellis" by Ernio Hernandez, Playbill.com, January 26, 2006
Ellis Bio American Theatre Wing

Notes

External links

1957 births
American musical theatre directors
American television directors
American television producers
Drama Desk Award winners
Living people
People from Washington, D.C.
Robinson Secondary School alumni